The 2015 Southern Conference baseball tournament will be held from May 19 through 24 at Joseph P. Riley Jr. Park in Charleston, South Carolina.  The annual event determines the conference champion of the Division I Southern Conference in college baseball.  The tournament winner earns the league's bid to the 2015 NCAA Division I baseball tournament.  This is the last of 20 athletic championships held by the conference in the 2013–14 academic year.

The tournament was originally held from 1950-53, when the Southern Conference was a large conference composed of several small schools and several large schools, the latter of which would form the Atlantic Coast Conference after the 1953 season.  The event was re-established in 1984 and has been held every year since.  Western Carolina has claimed nine championships, the most of any school, with The Citadel close behind at eight tournament wins.  Furman is the only other school current school with multiple championships, winning two.  UNC Greensboro is the only current and returning member to never win a title.  2014 champion and six-time winner Georgia Southern, along with Elon (two titles), Appalachian State (1 title), and Davidson (no titles) departed the conference after the 2014 season.  Mercer will make its first appearance in 2015, while East Tennessee State and VMI return to the league in 2015. Neither ETSU nor VMI won the event during their previous tenures in the league.

The tournament will be played in Charleston for the second year in a row after spending the previous two seasons in Greenville, South Carolina.  Charleston has hosted the event more than any other city.

Seeding and format
All nine teams will participate in the tournament, with the bottom two seeds playing a single-elimination play-in round.  The remaining teams will then be divided into two brackets and play double-elimination tournaments.  The winners of each bracket will play a single championship game.

Bracket

Play-In Round

Bracket One

Bracket Two

Final

References

2015 Southern Conference baseball season
Southern Conference Baseball Tournament
Southern Conference Tournament
Southern Conference baseball tournament